Gordi 3 (stylized as Gordi III on the cover) is the third studio album by Yugoslav rock band Gordi, released in 1981. Gordi 3 is the band's last progressive/hard rock-oriented album before their switch to heavy metal with the album Pakleni trio (Hell Trio).

Gordi 3 is the band's first studio album recorded with drummer Čedomir Petrović and the band's only studio album recorded with bass guitarist Zoran Bartulović. It is also the band's last album to feature keyboardist Goran Manojlović, who left the band after the album release. After Goran Manojlović's departure, Gordi would continue their career as a power trio.

The song "Greh" ("Sin") features lyrics written by poet and lyricist Duško Trifunović.

Track listing
All songs written by Zlatko Manojlović, except where noted.

Personnel
Zlatko Manojlović - vocals, guitar, producer
Goran Manojlović - keyboard, vocals
Zoran Bartulović - bass guitar
Čedomir Petrović - drums

Additional personnel
Ivan Ćulum - design

References 

Gordi III at Discogs

External links
Gordi III at Discogs

Gordi (band) albums
1981 albums
PGP-RTB albums